John Brodhead (October 5, 1770 – April 7, 1838) was a Methodist minister, an American politician and a U.S. Representative from New Hampshire.

Early life
Born in Lower Smithfield in the Province of Pennsylvania, Brodhead attended the common schools and Stroudsburg (Pennsylvania) Academy. He studied theology and was ordained a Methodist minister in 1794 remaining active in ministerial service for forty-four years.

Career
Brodhead moved in 1796 to New England, where he became supervisor of Methodist societies in the Connecticut Valley. He settled in Canaan, New Hampshire, in 1801, then moved to Newfields Village, Newmarket, New Hampshire, in 1809. From 1810 to about 1823, he occupied the parsonage and preached in the parish church.

A member of the New Hampshire Senate, 1817–1827, Brodhead also officiated as chaplain of the New Hampshire House of Representatives in 1825.

Elected as a Jacksonian  to the Twenty-first and Twenty-second Congresses, Brodhead served as United States Representative for the state of New Hampshire from March 4, 1829 – March 3, 1833.  He declined to be a candidate for renomination in 1832 and resumed his ministerial duties.

Death
Brodhead died in Newfields, Rockingham County, New Hampshire, on April 7, 1838 (age 67 years, 184 days). He is interred at Locust Grove Cemetery, Newfields, New Hampshire.

Family life
On August 17, 1801, Brodhead, son of Luke and Elizabeth Harrison Brodhead, married Mary Dodge, daughter of Thomas and Ruth Giddings Dodge. They had 12 children; six sons and six daughters.

References

External links

1770 births
1838 deaths
People from Fayette County, Pennsylvania
Methodists from New Hampshire
Jacksonian members of the United States House of Representatives from New Hampshire
19th-century American politicians
People from Newfields, New Hampshire
People from Newmarket, New Hampshire
People from Canaan, New Hampshire